Wild Card Games is a company which designs board games and card games.

History
The company was started in 2005 by Sean Byrne and his wife. Its first game was called Backpacker. In December 2013, the company released Who Knows Where?, a double-sided board game. In 2019, the company created a customised edition of Mapominoes for distribution to Interrail pass holders.

Mapominoes
Mapominoes is a card game where each card represents an individual country, and players take turns placing a country-card on the table, adjacent to a bordering country. It has been described as "like dominoes, but with maps". Editions include Europe, Asia, Africa, and the Americas.

References

Board game publishing companies
Card game publishing companies
2005 establishments in the United Kingdom